Zalak Desai (born Jhalak Desai), is an Indian television actress. She worked in serials like Muh Boli Shaadi, Sajan Ghar Jaana Hai. She played the role of Komal in Colors TV show Laado 2 and role of Rukmini in Star Bharat's show RadhaKrishn.

Career
Zalak is daughter of Gujarati actress Falguni Desai. She was born and brought up in Mumbai. Zalak started her career at the age of 16 in serial Sajan Ghar Jaana Hai in 2009, just after she completed her 10th standard with 90 percentage aggregate from R.N. Shah High School, Mumbai. She took a break to complete her 12th and graduation in B.Sc Biotechnology from Mithibai College (University of Mumbai) and returned in the Sony TV serial Dil Deke Dekho in 2014. Later, she worked in the serial Muh Boli Shaadi. She played Komal in Laado 2. She played her most popular character as Devi Rukmini in TV serial RadhaKrishn with co-actor Sumedh Mudgalkar as Krishna and co-actress Mallika Singh as Radha.

Television
 Hum Aapke Ghar Mein Rehte Hain (2015) as Pinky (Lead Role)
 Muh Boli Shaadi (2015) as Anmol Ratan Singh (Lead Role)
 Siya Ke Ram (2015) as Shanta (Extended Cameo Role)
 Ek Rishta Saajhedari Ka (2016) as Nikita (Negative lead Role)
 Laado 2 (2017–18) as Komal (Parallel lead Role)
 Namah Lakshmi Narayan (2019) as Devi Saraswati
 RadhaKrishn (2019–2023) as Maharani Rukmini
 Shubharambh (2020) as Darshana Reshammiya

References

External links
 

Living people
Actresses from Mumbai
Indian television actresses
Actresses in Hindi television
21st-century Indian actresses
1992 births